Gary F. Young is a former American politician from Idaho. Young was a Republican member of Idaho House of Representatives.

Early life 
On February 23, 1945, Young was born in Ottumwa, Iowa.

Education 
Young attended Mesa Junior College until 1965. Young attend Adams State College. In 1968, Young earned a Bachelor of Science degree from Colorado State University.

Career 
In 1968, in military, Young was a member of  the United States Army Reserve, until 1977.

In 1969, Young was a Sales Representative for Shell Chemical Company, until 1977.

In 1996, Young served as the Vice Chair of Latah County Republicans Central Committee, until 1998. In June 1998, Young served as the Chair of Latah County Republicans Central Committee, until 2000.

In 1997, Young became a Senior Marketing Representative for Novartis Crop Protection, until 1999.

On November 7, 2000, Young won the election and became a Republican member of Idaho House of Representatives for District 5, seat B. Young defeated Shirley G. Ringo with 51.0% of the votes.

On November 5, 2002, as an incumbent, Young sought a seat in District 6, seat B unsuccessfully. Young was defeated by Shirley G. Ringo with 53.2% of the votes.

Personal life 
Young's wife is Lynne Young. They have two children. Young and his family live in Moscow, Idaho.

References

External links 
 Latah GOP Minutes

Colorado State University alumni
Living people
Republican Party members of the Idaho House of Representatives
People from Moscow, Idaho
1945 births